Walter Boyd was a state legislator in Mississippi. He represented Yazoo County, Mississippi in the Mississippi House of Representatives in 1874 and 1875. J. G. Patterson was the other representative in the House from Yazoo County. In 1875, Julius Allen wrote about a meeting with Boyd in Yazoo City and the armed whites making threats against Republicans and potential African American voters.

See also
 African-American officeholders during and following the Reconstruction era

References

People from Yazoo County, Mississippi
African-American politicians during the Reconstruction Era
African-American state legislators in Mississippi
Members of the Mississippi House of Representatives